Alexander Famulla (born 20 September 1960) is a German former professional football goalkeeper.

References

External links
 

Living people
1960 births
Association football goalkeepers
German footballers
Karlsruher SC players
FC 08 Homburg players
Bundesliga players
2. Bundesliga players